Zegris is a Palearctic genus of butterflies in the family Pieridae. This genus was erected by Jean Baptiste Boisduval in 1836. It is characterized by the very strongly clubbed antennae and the bushy palpi, but especially by the shape of the larva and pupa and the manner of pupation.

Species
Zegris eupheme (Esper, 1804)
Zegris fausti Christoph, 1877 Turkestan, Iran, Iraq, Afghanistan, Pakistan
Zegris pyrothoe (Eversmann, 1832) southwestern Siberia, Turan, Kazakhstan, western China
Zegris zhungelensis Huang & Murayama, 1992 Xinjiang
Zegris meridionalis Lederer, 1852 central and southern Spain

References

External links

Anthocharini
Pieridae genera
Taxa named by Jean Baptiste Boisduval